What Is This Thing Called Science? (1976) is a  best-selling  textbook by Alan Chalmers.

Overview
The book is a guide to the philosophy of science which outlines the shortcomings of naive empiricist accounts of science, and describes and assesses modern attempts to replace them.  The book is written with minimal use of technical terms. What Is This Thing Called Science? was first published in 1976, and has been translated into many languages.

Editions
What Is This Thing Called Science?, Queensland University Press and Open University Press, 1976, pp. 157 + xvii. (Translated into German, Dutch, Italian Spanish and Chinese.) 
What Is This Thing Called Science?, Queensland University Press, Open University Press and Hackett, 2nd revised edition (6 new chapters), 1982, pp. 179 + xix. (Translated into German, Persian, French, Italian, Spanish, Dutch, Chinese, Japanese, Indonesian, Portuguese, Polish and Danish, Greek and Estonian.) 
What Is This Thing Called Science?, University of Queensland Press, Open University press, 3rd revised edition, Hackett, 1999. (Translated into Korean.)
What Is This Thing Called Science?, University of Queensland Press, Open University press, 4th edition, 2013.

See also
 The Structure of Scientific Revolutions, by Thomas Kuhn
 The Logic of Scientific Discovery, by Karl Popper

References

External links
Review of What is this Thing Called Science?
 Deborah G. Mayo: Review of the third edition of What is this Thing Called Science? in the newsletter of the Australasian Society for the History, Philosophy and Social Studies of Science (AAHPSSS), 2000.

1976 non-fiction books
English-language books
Philosophy of science books
Philosophy textbooks
University of Queensland Press books